Igor Roberto Oliveira de Souza (born 18 June 2000), known as Igor Souza or just Igor, is a Brazilian footballer who plays for Portuguesa. Mainly a central defender, he can also play as a defensive midfielder.

Club career
Born in Itaquaquecetuba, São Paulo, Igor was an Elosport youth graduate. He made his senior debut with the club during the 2018 Campeonato Paulista Segunda Divisão, and moved to Portuguesa in the following year, initially to the under-20 team.

Promoted to the first team for the 2021 season, Igor made his senior debut on 14 September 2021, coming on as a late substitute for Cesinha in a 2–1 home win over Juventus-SP, for the year's Copa Paulista. The following 4 February, after three more matches, he renewed his contract until May 2023.

Initially out of Lusas list for the 2023 Campeonato Paulista, Igor was registered by the club in the place of injured Pedro Bortoluzo on 26 February 2023. He made his first match of the season on 5 March, replacing goalscorer João Victor in a 2–1 away win over Mirassol, as the club narrowly avoided relegation.

Career statistics

Honours
Portuguesa
Campeonato Paulista Série A2: 2022

References

2000 births
Living people
Footballers from São Paulo (state)
Brazilian footballers
Association football defenders
Elosport Capão Bonito players
Associação Portuguesa de Desportos players